Fatih Karagümrük Spor Kulübü Kadın Futbol Takımı, alsoknown as Wulfz Fatih Karagümrük, is a Turkish football team as part of the Fatih Karagümrük S.K. based in the Karagümrük neighbourhood of the Fatih district in İstanbul. Established on 2 October 2021, the red-black colored team currently play in the Turkish Women's Football Super League, the top tier of women's football in Turkey.

History
The women's football section of the club was formed after the Turkish Football Federation established the Turkish Women's Football Super League replacing Turkish Women's First Football League in 2021, and appealed to the major men's football clubs in the Süper Lig to participate in the women's football. The women's football team of Fatih Karagümrük S.K. is one of the eight new formed teams, which joined the 2021–22 Turkish Women's Football Super League for the first time. The team is sponsored by the second-hand car dealer Vavacars. By February 2022 after eight league rounds, sports kit company Wulfz became the new sponsor.

Stadium

Fatih Karagümrük women's team play their home matches at Vefa Stadium, which situated in the Karagümrük neighborhood and aiso called Karagümrük Stadium. It is owned by the Ministry of Youth and Sports and operated by Fatih Karagümrük S.K.

Statistics
.

(1): League runner-up after Group leadership and play-offs
(2): Season in progress

Current squad
.
.
Head coach:  Hatice Bahar Özgüvenç

Kit history

Squads

References

 
Women's football clubs in Turkey
Association football clubs established in 2021
Football clubs in Istanbul
Sport in Fatih
2021 establishments in Turkey
Sports teams in Istanbul